Bungudu (or Bungundu) is a Local Government Area in Zamfara State, Nigeria. Its headquarters are in the town of Bungudu at.

It has an area of 2,293 km and a population of 257,917 at the 2006 census.

The postal code of the area is 881.

References

Local Government Areas in Zamfara State